THG may refer to:

 Tetrahydrogestrinone, an anabolic steroid
 The Humble Guys, a 1990s IBM PC cracking group
 Third-harmonic generation, in nonlinear optics
 THG plc, an e-commerce company formerly known as The Hut Group
 THG Sports, a former sports ticketing and corporate hospitality company
 Hanover Insurance, NYSE symbol THG
 Thangool Airport, IATA airport code "THG"